Kibawe, officially the Municipality of Kibawe, is a 2nd class municipality in the province of Bukidnon, Philippines. According to the 2020 census, it has a population of 41,897 people.

History

In the early days of the American regime, Kibawe was populated by a tribe of Mamadas people.  The Mamadas people were nomadic by nature and subsisted on hunting and forest products. They maintained small plots of corn, camote and gabi in places where they built their temporary shelters. They practised a feudal type of government and were responsible only to their datus who governed as their political chieftain, judge, religious leader and armed-forces chief. The most famous among the “datus” was Datu Mambantayao. Datu Mambantayao's bravery and love for his subjects were unexcelled and remain in the hearts and minds of the people to this day. One of the historic events of his life as a datu was the capturing of a lady whom he loved. She was abducted by a tribe from Bugcaon, Malaybalay, Bukidnon, seventy kilometers away from Kibawe. Datu Mambantayao, along with his armed trained warriors marched to Bugcaon, which they attacked heavily, plundering and killing the Bugcaons’ chieftain for the recovery of the lady who he later married. Datu Mambantayao named this place Kibawe from the word “Guibawe” meaning recovery.

Bukidnon was eventually created as a separate province from Agusan. Kibawe became a barrio of Maramag. It now occupied the southern portion of Bukidnon, bounded on the north by Maramag, on the south by Carmen, Cotabato, on the east by Magpet, Cotabato and on the west by Lanao Sur. It covered the present areas of the mother municipality of Kibawe, the daughter municipalities of Dangcagan, Damulog and Kadingilan and grand daughter municipality of Kitaotao, with a land area of approximately 

Kibawe became a municipal district in 1931 and then became a regular municipality on July 1, 1956 under Executive Order 272 issued by then vice president, later president of the Philippines, Carlos P. Garcia. Later on, barrio Dangcagan separated into a regular municipality. The growth and development of the municipality served high after the Second World War as immigrants from all over the country (mainly from Visayas and Mindanao) came flocking into the fertile valleys and low mountains of the community.

The original populace of the town, the Manobos, have practically been replaced by the above-mentioned lowlanders. To date, only a few Manobos remain in the interior barrios. In the year 1972, the big barrios of Damulog and Kadingilan were created into separate municipalities. The Kibaweños of today are people of diverse ethnic origin including the autochthonous Manobos and Bukidnon Lumad tribes, as well as the immigrant Cebuanos, Boholanos, Ilonggos, Negrenses and Warays. All are hardworking, friendly, peace-loving and law-abiding. Together, they work towards a common goal - the socio-economic advancement and amelioration of their lives as a whole.

Geography
Kibawe is a rich land at the center of Mindanao, located in southern Bukidnon. It is bounded in the north by the municipality of Dangcagan, on the south by the municipality of Damulog, on the east by the municipality of Magpet, North Cotabato, and on the west by the municipality of Kadingilan with Muleta River serving as a natural boundary.

Topography

Kibawe has a larger percentage of rolling than plain areas. A rough estimate is 80% rolling hills and 20% plainlands. The important landmarks of the municipality are several mountain peaks, clustered over most of the barangays. Pulangi and Muleta Rivers serve as the major fishing grounds of the people residing near the bank, as do the beautiful and magnificent Paragupac Cave in Barangay Spring and the Ragubrob, and Mayabu springs at Barangay New Kidapawan.

Climate

The climate conditions of the entire municipality of Kibawe is pleasant and cool throughout the year. It is relatively dry from January to April and wet the rest of the year.

Barangays
Kibawe is politically subdivided into 23 barangays.

Demographics

Economy

Transportation
Kibawe is accessible by land transportation. The existing land transportation in the city consists of multicabs from nearby towns, single motorcycles, buses from Cagayan de Oro and General Santos, tricycles, and private vehicles facilitate the movement of people and goods to and from all places in the town. Traveling from Poblacion is mainly by land through all kinds of vehicles.

Notable people from Kibawe

Manny Pacquiao, Filipino boxer, eight-division world champion and Senator, was born in Kibawe, Bukidnon on December 17, 1978.

References

External links
 [ Philippine Standard Geographic Code]
Philippine Census Information

Municipalities of Bukidnon
Populated places on the Rio Grande de Mindanao
Establishments by Philippine executive order